This is a list of the current members of the Privy Council of the United Kingdom, along with the roles they fulfil and the date when they were sworn of the council. , there are 742 members on the council. Throughout this article, the prefix The Rt Hon. is omitted, because every counsellor bears it, as is the postnominal PC, as every counsellor who is also a peer uses it.

The council is composed mostly of politicians (be they from the British government, other parties, or Commonwealth governments) and civil servants, both current and retired (since membership is for life). Among those politicians generally sworn of the council are ministers of the Crown, the few most senior figures of the Loyal Opposition, the parliamentary leader of the third-largest party (currently SNP Westminster Leader), and a couple of the most senior figures in the devolved British governments, including the first ministers. Besides these, the council includes a very few members of the Royal Family (usually the consort and heir apparent only), a few dozen judges (the Supreme Court justices, the senior judges of England and Wales, and the senators of the College of Justice of the Inner House in Scotland) and a few clergy (the three most senior Church of England bishops).

List of counsellors

See also
 List of Royal members of the Privy Council
 Privy Council of the United Kingdom
 List of Commonwealth heads of government

Notes

References

External links
 List of Members of the Privy Council

Privy Council
Current
Privy Counsellors, Current